The Border Region: Schools & Youth Competitions structures established for the 2015–16 season group schools and clubs based on the development structures they have in place, the volume of teams they operate and results over recent seasons. The fixture programmes arranged by Scottish Rugby will guarantee blocks of 'school v school' or 'club v club' fixtures in the autumn phase of the season

History
In December 2013 Scottish Rugby launched its strategic initiative ‘Youth Rugby – A Strategy for Schools’. Former Scotland rugby coach Frank Hadden conducted the review for Scottish Rugby.

"In recent years youth rugby has had many changes in competition structure mainly based on the needs and wants of participating teams, some teams have thrived, some teams have struggled but change has been a constant and it is obvious that the current structure continues to be affected by; withdrawal of teams from leagues, weather, lack of competitive fixtures for some teams, a disjointed approach to fixturing, a reluctance by some to play on a regular basis. There is no doubt that the structure for youth rugby has reached a point where a radical change in approach is required to bring stability to our game."

Format

U18 Border Semi Junior League - Clubs

U16 Border U16 League - Clubs

S3 (U15) - Schools

S2 (U14) - Schools

S1 (U13) - Schools

Leagues

Border Semi-Junior League

Fixtures, results and tables for the Border Semi-Junior League

- Two teams are based in Northumberland, England - Berwick Colts and Tynedale RFC

|}

Border U16 League

Fixtures, results and tables for the Border U16 League

- One club is based in Northumberland, England - Berwick RFC. The club are affiliated to both the Scottish Rugby Union and the English Rugby Football Union.

|}

References

Competitions
Scottish Borders